Congo competed at the 2014 Summer Youth Olympics, in Nanjing, China from 16 August to 28 August 2014.

Athletics

Congo qualified one athlete.

Qualification Legend: Q=Final A (medal); qB=Final B (non-medal); qC=Final C (non-medal); qD=Final D (non-medal); qE=Final E (non-medal)

Girls
Track & road events

Badminton

Congo was given a quota to compete by the tripartite committee.

Singles

Doubles

Beach Volleyball

Congo qualified a boys' and girls' team by their performance at the CAVB Qualification Tournament.

Table Tennis

Congo was given a quota to compete by the tripartite committee.

Singles

Team

Qualification Legend: Q=Main Bracket (medal); qB=Consolation Bracket (non-medal)

Wrestling

Congo was given an invitation to compete from the Tripartite Commission.

Key:
  - Victory by Fall.
  - Decision by Points - the loser with technical points.
  - Decision by Points - the loser without technical points.

Girls

References

2014 in the Republic of the Congo sport
Nations at the 2014 Summer Youth Olympics
Republic of the Congo at the Youth Olympics